The Europe Gate is a sculpture made out of LiTraCon, or Light Transmitting Concrete. It is a wall 3.5 meters squared and commemorates Hungary joining the European Union. It was built in 2004 in Fort Monostor in the town of Komárom by Áron Losonczi and Orsolya Vadász.

References

Hungarian sculpture
Sculptures in Hungary